The 1992–93 season was the 47th season in FK Partizan's existence. This article shows player statistics and matches that the club played during the 1992–93 season.

Players

Squad information
Players (league matches/league goals)
 Goran Pandurović
 Nikola Damjanac
 Vujadin Stanojković
 Nebojša Gudelj
 Slaviša Jokanović
 Gordan Petrić
 Budimir Vujačić
 Vuk Rašović
 Goran Bogdanović
 Petar Vasiljević
 Albert Nađ
 Bratislav Mijalković
 Zlatko Zahovič
 Dragan Ćirić
 Ljubomir Vorkapić
 Branko Brnović
 Slobodan Krčmarević
 Savo Milošević
 Đorđe Tomić
 Slobodan Milanović
 Dejan Rađenović
 Blažo Pešikan
 Dejan Tasić

Competitions

First League of FR Yugoslavia

Matches

FR Yugoslavia Cup

See also
 List of FK Partizan seasons

References

External links
 Official website
 Partizanopedia 1992-93  (in Serbian)

FK Partizan seasons
Partizan
Serbian football championship-winning seasons